Hagelsdorf is a small village in the commune of Biwer, in the canton of Grevenmacher, in Luxembourg.  it has a population of 21 inhabitants.

References

Villages in Luxembourg